The Museum of Evolution of Polish Academy of Sciences is the display area of the natural history museum in Warsaw, Poland. It is the public front of the Muzeum i Instytut Zoologii  or Zoology Museum and the Instytut Paleobiologii or Paleobiology Institute. It is based at the Palace of Culture and Science.

References

External links 

 

Evolution
Natural history museums in Poland
Institutes of the Polish Academy of Sciences